Last is a 2015 South Korean television series based on the webtoon of the same name by Kang Hyung-kyu. Starring Yoon Kye-sang and Lee Beom-soo, it aired on jTBC on Fridays and Saturdays at 20:40 (KST) time slot from July 24 to September 12, 2015 for 16 episodes.

Synopsis
In desperate straits, Tae-ho goes on the run from loan shark gangsters and descends into the underbelly of Seoul. He discovers a secret society of homeless people living inside Seoul Station, one that has its own strict hierarchy and rules. Tae-ho vows to find out what went wrong with his deal, claw himself up from rock bottom, and get his life back.

Cast

Main
 Yoon Kye-sang as Jang Tae-ho
 Lee Beom-soo as Kwak Heung-sam
 Seo Yea-ji as Shin Na-ra
 Park Ye-jin as Seo Mi-joo
 Park Won-sang as Ryu Jong-gu

Supporting
 Gong Hyung-jin as Cha Hae-jin
 Jeong Jong-jun as Chairman Jo
 Ahn Se-ha as Go Young-chil
 Goo Jae-yee as Yoon Jung-min
 Lee Yong-woo as Kang Se-hoon
 Kim Hyung-kyu as Samagwui ("mantis")
 Lee Cheol-min as Doksa ("poisonous snake")
 Jang Won-young as Akeo ("crocodile")
 Kim Young-woong as Sergeant Bae
 Jo Jae-yoon as Baemnun ("snake eye")
 Yoon Je-moon as Jakdoo ("straw cutter")
 Lee Do-kyeong as President Jung
 Park Hyuk-kwon as Park Min-soo

References

External links
 Last official jTBC website  
 Last at AStory Co., Ltd.
 Last at Drama House
 
 Last webtoon at Daum 

2015 South Korean television series debuts
2015 South Korean television series endings
JTBC television dramas
Television shows based on South Korean webtoons
South Korean crime television series
South Korean action television series
Television series by AStory
Television series by Drama House